= Mato Alto =

Region of Rio de Janeiro, Brazil

Coordinates: 22°54′30″S 43°21′30″W

Mato Alto is a region of Rio de Janeiro, but not officially recognized as a neighborhood.
